Saloio is a non-urban person, i.e., a person living outside a large city in the countryside. Originally, it was a term applied to those who lived in the rural areas surrounding the Portuguese capital Lisbon.

It is made from sheep's milk with no salt. It is a firm cheese usually served in small cylinders that are 5 cm wide and 6 cm high.

References

Portuguese cheeses
Sheep's-milk cheeses